"Heart Skips a Beat"  is a 2010 song by Olly Murs from the album In Case You Didn't Know.

Heart Skips a Beat may also refer to:

 "Heart Skips a Beat", a 2011 song by Lenka from the album Two
 "Heart Skips a Beat", a 2012 song by Toy from the eponymous album Toy
 "Heart Skips a Beat", a 2014 song by Little Hurricane
 "The Heart Skips A Beat", a 2015 TV episode of Pangako Sa 'Yo

See also
 
 "Heart Skipped a Beat", a 2009 song by the xx off the eponymous album xx
 The Beat That My Heart Skipped, a 2005 French noir film
 "My Heart Skips a Beat", a 1964 single by Buck Owens
 "My Heart Skips a Beat" (The Cover Girls song), a 1989 song by The Cover Girls 
 "My Heart Skips a Beat", a 1978 song by Duke Jordan from the album Duke's Artistry

 Skipped beat (disambiguation), including the cardiac medical condition